Stephen Abbott (born 24 March 1956, in Broken Hill, New South Wales) is an Australian comedian and author, also known under the comedic moniker of The Sandman or occasionally Sandy. He was a member of the band The Castanet Club with others such as Mikey Robins, Angela Moore and Maynard.

Bibliography
 
 
 Observations from a Moving Vehicle (1998) ABC Books 
 Big Man's World  (1998) with Tony Squires and  Mikey Robins
 Pleasant Avenue (1999) ABC Books 
 204 Bell Street (2000)
 Sandman's Uncertain Years (2001)
 Diary of a Bus Clown (2002)

Filmography
 The Sideshow with Paul McDermott (2007) TV Series
 Under The Grandstand (2005) TV-Series during Ashes in England
 Sandman in Siberia (2005) Filmed as a documentary, The Sandman (Steve Abbott) and his mother (Evelyn Abbott) return to their ancestral home in Siberia, taking photos and greetings from the Efremoff family in Australia in an attempt to reunite with long lost cousins (apparently one of the highest rating programs on Australia's SBS Network in 2004).
 In Siberia Tonight (2004–5) TV-Series
 The Scree (2004)
 You Can't Stop The Murders (2003)
 The Fat (2000) TV-Series
 GNW Night Lite (1999) TV-Series
 Good News Weekend (1998) TV-Series
 Children of the Revolution (1996)
 Good News Week (1996) TV-Series
 The Comedy Sale (1993) TV-Series
 The Castanet Club (1990)
 Young Einstein (1988)

Discography 
 This is my Surfboard released as a book simultaneously
 204 Bell St
 Pleasant Avenue
 Castanet Club (1986)
 Johnny Goodman (1988)
 Showbag by The Musical Flags (c1981)

External links 
 
 Steve Abbott interviewed in The Age
 Steve Abbott commenting on two vintage Sandman stories from Triple J

References

1956 births
Australian male television actors
Living people
People from Broken Hill, New South Wales
Australian people of Russian descent
Triple J announcers
University of Newcastle (Australia) alumni
Australian male comedians